Ephraim Dawson (died 27 August 1746) was an Anglo-Irish politician.

Dawson was the son of William Dawson and Elizabeth Jardine. He was a successful banker, and used his wealth to purchase an estate at Portarlington, County Laois. In 1713, he was elected as a Member of Parliament for Portarlington in the Irish House of Commons. He represented the seat until 1715, when he was elected to represent Queen's County; he sat for the constituency until his death in 1746.

Dawson married Anne Preston, daughter and heiress of Samuel Preston. He was succeeded by his son, William Dawson, who was created Viscount Carlow in 1776.

References

Year of birth unknown
1746 deaths
18th-century Anglo-Irish people
Irish MPs 1713–1714
Irish MPs 1715–1727
Irish MPs 1727–1760
Members of the Parliament of Ireland (pre-1801) for Portarlington
Members of the Parliament of Ireland (pre-1801) for Queen's County constituencies